Patricroft railway station serving Patricroft in Greater Manchester, England. The station is on Green Lane, just north of the junction with Cromwell Road and just east of the Bridgewater Canal.

History

The station is situated on the world's first inter-city passenger railway, between Liverpool and Manchester, and is also located close to the world's first commercial canal. The station used to have an adjacent engine shed, Patricroft MPD, which was located to the rear of the Manchester-bound platform on the northern side of the station. The engine shed opened in 1884 and closed in 1968. The majority of the station buildings were demolished in the 1980s, with only a waiting shelter remaining on each platform.

Facilities
The station is unstaffed and has no permanent buildings; it does now though have ticket machines in place to allow passengers to buy tickets (or a permit to travel) prior to boarding.  Train running information is provided by telephone, digital PIS screens and timetable posters.  The platforms are linked by subway, but neither have step-free access as the subway has stairs from the station entrance to platform level.

Services
Monday to Saturdays there is generally an hourly service from the station to  via Manchester Piccadilly and  eastbound, and Newton-le-Willows and Liverpool Lime Street westbound. These are operated by the Northern Electrics Class 319 and Class 323 EMUs on a stopping service between Liverpool and Manchester. Services to and from Manchester Victoria are now very limited (peak periods and late evenings) since the May 2018 timetable change.

The Sunday service is the same, although trains operate to  via Piccadilly and the Airport.

References

External links 

Friends of Patricroft Station - campaign group for improvements to the railway station
The station on a 1948 OD map via npe maps
The station on an 1849 OS map via National Library of Scotland

Railway stations in Salford
DfT Category F2 stations
Former London and North Western Railway stations
Railway stations in Great Britain opened in 1830
Northern franchise railway stations
1830 establishments in England
Eccles, Greater Manchester